The Valiant Sixty were a group of early activists and itinerant preachers in the Religious Society of Friends (Quakers). Mainly from northern England, they spread the ideas of the Friends in the second half of the 17th century. They were also called First Publishers of Truth. In fact they numbered more than 60.

Some prominent members
George Fox is often considered the founder of the Friends movement. Some historians see him as one among several people with similar religious ideas who eventually banded together. He outlasted some of the other leaders, and his speeches and journal were very influential.
Margaret Fell was one of the earliest sponsors of Fox and the Friends movement. She opened her home, Swarthmoor Hall, to Quaker meetings. She later married Fox.
Edward Burrough was an early preacher and apologist for the Friends who held a pamphlet debate with John Bunyan.
Mary Fisher was a preacher and missionary who travelled to the New World and to Turkey to spread Friends beliefs.
Francis Howgill was already a Nonconformist when he met Fox. It is possible that he influenced Fox as much as Fox influenced him. His sister Mary was also a member of the Valiant Sixty.
Elizabeth Hooton was a former Baptist, who joined the Society of Friends in its early days. She died on a trip to the New World with other Friends, including George Fox.
James Nayler was a radical member of the Society of Friends. Fox and he had a disagreement about his more radical behaviour, but he was one of the most influential Friends in that period.
George Whitehead was a teenage preacher who travelled across England. Elizabeth Fletcher and Elizabeth Leavens were teenagers, too – as most probably were Jane and Dorothy Waugh, when they started in the work.

Distinctives
These missionaries of Quakerism were unusual in their time. Most other preaching was done by well-educated ordained male clergymen, but most of the Valiant Sixty were ordinary farmers and tradesmen, and several of them were women. Because the Valiant Sixty came from the northern part of England they were considered backward. Because they stood against the church structure in place in England at that time, many of them suffered imprisonment or corporal punishment or both. Once Quaker practices were outlawed, they were in technical violation of the law. They can therefore be seen as early practitioners of civil disobedience.

Members of the Valiant Sixty travelled not only throughout England, but to the rest of Great Britain, Europe, and North America. One of them, Mary Fisher, went as far as Turkey and spoke with the Sultan about her beliefs.

List of members

See also
Quaker history
Quakers in North America

References

Vipont, Elfrida George Fox And The Valiant Sixty, 1976. 
Taylor, Ernest The Valiant Sixty, 1951 [1947], third ed. with new foreword and map

External links
Quaker Essay about the Valiant Sixty
Evangelical Essay about the Valiant Sixty
Article about Women Among the Valiant Sixty

Quaker missionaries
English Protestant missionaries
Quakerism-related lists
Lists of Christian religious leaders